Di-tert-butyl-iminodicarboxylate is an organic compound that can be described with the formula [(CH3)3COC(O)]2NH. It is a white solid that is soluble in organic solvents. The compound is used as a reagent for the preparation of primary amines from alkyl halides. It was popularized as an alternative to the Gabriel synthesis for the same conversion. Amines can also be prepared from alcohols by dehydration using the Mitsunobu reaction.

In the usual implementation the reagent is deprotonated to give the potassium salt, which is N-alkylated. The Boc protecting groups are subsequently removed under acidic conditions.

References

Imides
Carbamates
Reagents for organic chemistry
Tert-butyl compounds